Divine Restoration, or DR, is a religious renovation television series. Created by Canada's VisionTV, instead of renovating homes like most shows, it renovates houses of worship.

Hosted by Jim Codrington and Catherine Burdon, the series actually taps into the talents of the congregation. Instead of hiring electricians, plumbers, carpenters, architects, etc., DR finds people of relevant professions to donate their time to lead the rest of the parish's members in the work.

The series aims to not discriminate against particular faiths, representing as many denominations as possible. They have renovated in locations as distant from each other as Toronto, Halifax, Winnipeg, Ottawa, Montreal, New York, Montgomery, Orlando, Atlanta, New Orleans, Chicago and Milwaukee.

External links
TV One: Divine Restoration - About the Show

Canadian reality television series
Makeover reality television series
Christian entertainment television series
Home renovation television series
Church architecture
TV One (American TV channel) original programming
English-language television shows